The Diaoshuilou Falls are a  wide waterfall in Heilongjiang Province, People's Republic of China at the northern end of Lake Jingpo. The cascade is at its most impressive during the wetter summer months whilst in winter it freezes into a curtain of ice.

Reference

Waterfalls of China
Landforms of Heilongjiang
Tourist attractions in Heilongjiang